Michigan Southern Railroad could refer to:
The Southern Railroad (Michigan), built by the state of Michigan (1837–1846)
The Michigan Southern Railroad (1846–1855), which bought the state line, and became part of the Lake Shore and Michigan Southern Railway
The Michigan Southern Railroad (1989), a short line